The San Marino Confederation of Labour (CSdL) is a national trade union center in San Marino. It was founded in 1943 and has a membership of 2400.

The CSdL is affiliated with the International Trade Union Confederation, and the European Trade Union Confederation.

References

External links
 CSdL official site.

Trade unions in San Marino
International Trade Union Confederation
European Trade Union Confederation
1943 establishments in San Marino
Trade unions established in 1943